Gary Francis Leonard (born February 16, 1967) is a retired American professional basketball player. At 7'1" and 295 lbs, he played center.

College career
In 1989, Leonard emerged as one of the leading centers available for the 1989 NBA Draft with a strong senior season at the University of Missouri, posting career highs in points (10.4 ppg) and rebounds (5.5 rpg), shooting .593 from the field and totalling 42 blocked shots. He was the only Missouri player to start every game in 1988–89, after being a part-time starter during his first three years. His .628 field goal percentage as a junior was among the nation's leaders in 1987-88. He helped Missouri advance to the "Sweet 16" of the NCAA tournament that season, where they lost to Syracuse University.

Professional career
Drafted with the 34th overall pick by the Minnesota Timberwolves in 1989, Leonard spent one season in Minnesota and played from 1990-92 with the Atlanta Hawks.  He also played one season in the Continental Basketball Association (CBA), splitting the 1990–91 season between the Sioux Falls Skyforce and Cedar Rapids Silver Bullets.  Leonard averaged 3.2 points and 3.8 rebounds in 19 career CBA games.
He also played in Greece for Peristeri B.C. and Milon B.C.

References

External links
College & NBA stats @ basketballreference.com
at esake.gr

1967 births
Living people
American expatriate basketball people in Greece
American men's basketball players
Atlanta Hawks players
Basketball players from Illinois
Cedar Rapids Silver Bullets players
Centers (basketball)
Milon B.C. players
Minnesota Timberwolves draft picks
Minnesota Timberwolves players
Missouri Tigers men's basketball players
Peristeri B.C. players
Sioux Falls Skyforce (CBA) players
Sportspeople from Belleville, Illinois